Davisville (also Clairville or Claysville) is an unincorporated community in Wood County, West Virginia, United States.  Its elevation is 620 feet (189 m).  It has a post office with the ZIP code 26142.  The North Bend Rail Trail passes through the community.

References

Unincorporated communities in Wood County, West Virginia
Unincorporated communities in West Virginia